Samuel Boyse (1696-1711) was an Irish politician.

Boyse was born in Dublin and educated at Trinity College, Dublin. From 1725 until 1730, he was MP for Bannow.

He died as a result of a duel.

References

Alumni of Trinity College Dublin
Members of the Parliament of Ireland (pre-1801) for County Carlow constituencies
Irish MPs 1715–1727
Irish MPs 1727–1760
Politicians from Dublin (city)
1696 births
1711 deaths